The Chinese Detective is a British television police procedural drama series, first transmitted by the BBC between 1981 and 1982. The series was created by Ian Kennedy Martin, who had previously devised The Sweeney and Juliet Bravo.

Plot
The series starred British Chinese actor David Yip as Detective Sergeant John Ho. Yip became the first Chinese lead actor in any British television drama series. The series offered traditional police procedural storylines in a setting of occasional prejudice and distrust within the police force, and the prejudice displayed by those Ho encounters whilst doing his job. Like many other television detectives of the time, Ho was something of a maverick, often using unorthodox methods to solve crimes. The series was set in and around London's Docklands, before redevelopment began in the 1980s.

His immediate superior in the force, Detective Chief Inspector Berwick (Derek Martin), often provided him a source of stress, often reprimanding him for his approach towards the cases he was investigating. Ho is also often seen visiting his father, Joe (Robert Lee), for advice at the shipping container plant where he worked. Like many other television detectives of the era, Ho drove a 'classic' car. In this case, Ho's vehicle of choice was a Morris Minor Traveller.

Cast
 David Yip as Detective Sergeant John Ho
 Derek Martin as Detective Chief Inspector Berwick
 Arthur Kelly as Detective Sergeant Donald Chegwyn
 Larrington Walker as Ezra (Series 1—2)
 Robert Lee as Joe Ho (Series 1)
 Allan Surtees as Ex-Detective Chief Inspector Marley-Harris (Series 1)
 John Bott as Detective Chief Superintendent Halsey (Series 1—2)
 Richard Rees as Dr. David Li (Series 2)

Episodes

Series 1 (1981)

Series 2 (1982)

Home media
Both series were released on DVD in the UK in a complete box set on 14 April 2008.

References

External links

BBC television dramas
British Chinese mass media
1981 British television series debuts
1982 British television series endings
1980s British crime television series
British detective television series
English-language television shows